The Modern Montessori School (MMS) is a private school in Amman, Jordan founded by Randa Amin Hasan. It caters to students from 3–18 years old, and is affiliated with the International Baccalaureate  and accredited by the International Centre for Montessori Education (ICME). It was established in 1985 and is built on a 24,000 m2 piece of land. It is designed to meet international standards in school requirements. It offers a Montessori Early Childhood Education Programme from Nursery 1 to KG2; bilingual English/Arabic curriculum for grades 1–8; a specially formulated pre-IB Bridge Years (BYP) curriculum for grades 9 + 10; and IB curriculum for grades 11 + 12. This school is recognized by the International Baccalaureate 
Organization as a full IB school. It offers the PYP system for grades 1-5 and the MYP system for grades 6-10 and finally the IB diploma for grades 11 and 12.

Its students and administration hold an annual Model Arab League conference ("AMAL") as well as other yearly conferences, events, and seminars.

External links

 School website

Elementary and primary schools in Jordan
International schools in Jordan
International Baccalaureate schools in Jordan
Private schools in Jordan
Schools in Amman
Montessori schools in Jordan
Educational institutions established in 1985
1985 establishments in Jordan
High schools and secondary schools in Jordan
International high schools